Viscount  was a Japanese samurai and admiral of the Tokugawa navy of Bakumatsu period Japan, who remained faithful to the Tokugawa shogunate and fought against the new Meiji government until the end of the Boshin War. He later served in the Meiji government as one of the founders of the Imperial Japanese Navy.

Biography

Early life
Enomoto was born as a member of a samurai family in the direct service of the Tokugawa clan in the Shitaya district of Edo (modern Taitō, Tokyo). Enomoto started learning Dutch in the 1850s, and after Japan's forced "opening" by Commodore Matthew Perry in 1854, he studied at the Tokugawa shogunate's Naval Training Center in Nagasaki and at the Tsukiji Warship Training Center in Edo.

At the age of 26, Enomoto was sent to the Netherlands to study western techniques in naval warfare and to procure western technologies. He stayed in Europe from 1862 to 1867, and became fluent in both the Dutch and English languages.

During his stay in Europe, Enomoto had realized that the telegraph would be an important means of communication in the future, and started planning a system to connect Edo and Yokohama.

Boshin War and Meiji Restoration
During the Meiji Restoration, after the surrender of Edo in 1868 during the Boshin War to forces loyal to the Satchō Alliance, Enomoto refused to deliver up his warships, and escaped to Hakodate in Hokkaido with the remainder of the Tokugawa Navy and a handful of French military advisers and their leader Jules Brunet. His fleet of eight steam warships was the strongest in Japan at the time.

Enomoto hoped to create an independent country under the rule of the Tokugawa family in Hokkaidō, but the Meiji government refused to accept partition of Japan. On 27 January 1869, the Tokugawa loyalists declared the foundation of the Republic of Ezo and elected Enomoto as president.

The Meiji government forces engaged and defeated Enomoto's forces in the Naval Battle of Hakodate on May 1869. Following the Battle of Hakodate on 27 June 1869, the Republic of Ezo collapsed, and Hokkaidō came under the rule of the central government headed by the Meiji Emperor.

As a Meiji politician

After his surrender, Enomoto was arrested, accused of high treason and imprisoned. However, the leaders of the new Meiji government (largely at the insistence of Kuroda Kiyotaka) realized that Enomoto various talents and accumulated knowledge could be of use, pardoned him in 1872. Enomoto became one of the few former Tokugawa loyalists who made the transition to the new ruling elite, as politics at the time was dominated by men from Chōshū and Satsuma, who had a strong bias against outsiders in general, and former Tokugawa retainers in particular. However, Enomoto was an exception, and rose quickly within the new ruling clique, to a higher status than any other member of the former Tokugawa administrations.

In 1874, Enomoto was given the rank of vice-admiral in the fledgling Imperial Japanese Navy. The following year, he was sent to Russia as a special envoy to negotiate the Treaty of St. Petersburg. The successful conclusion of the treaty was very well received in Japan and further raised Enomoto's prestige within the ruling circles, and the fact that Enomoto had been chosen for such an important mission was seen as evidence of reconciliation between former foes in the government.

In 1880, Enomoto became . In 1885, his diplomatic skills were again called upon to assist Itō Hirobumi in concluding the Convention of Tientsin with Qing China. Afterwards, Enomoto held a series of high posts in the Japanese government. He was Japan's first Minister of Communications (1885–1888) after the introduction of the cabinet system in 1885. He was also Minister of Agriculture and Commerce from 1894 to 1897, Minister of Education from 1889 to 1890 and Foreign Minister from 1891 to 1892.

In 1887, Enomoto was ennobled to the rank of viscount under the kazoku peerage system, and was selected as a member of the Privy Council.

Enomoto was especially active in promoting Japanese emigration through settler colonies in the Pacific Ocean and South and Central America. In 1891, he established—against the will of the cabinet of Matsukata Masayoshi—a "section for emigration" in the Foreign Ministry, with the task of encouraging emigration and finding new potential territories for Japanese settlement overseas. Two years later, after leaving the government, Enomoto also helped to establish a private organization, the "Colonial Association", to promote external trade and emigration.

Death
Enomoto died in 1908 at the age of 72. His grave is at the temple of Kisshō-ji, Bunkyō-ku, Tokyo.

Honours

 Grand Cordon of the Order of the Rising Sun (1886)
Senior Second Rank (1896)
 Grand Cordon of the Order of the Paulownia Flowers (1908)

See also
Jules Brunet
Imperial Japanese Navy
Naval Battle of Hakodate

Notes

References
Kamo, Giichi. Enomoto Takeaki. Chuo Koronsha  (Japanese)
Yamamoto, Atsuko. Jidai o shissoshita kokusaijin Enomoto Takeaki: Raten Amerika iju no michi o hiraku. Shinzansha (1997).  (Japanese)
Akita, George. (1967) Foundations of constitutional government in modern Japan, 1868–1900. Cambridge, Harvard University Press, .
Hane, Mikiso. Modern Japan: A Historical Survey. Westview Press (2001). 
Hillsborough, Romulus. Shinsengumi: The Shogun's Last Samurai Corps. Tuttle Publishing (2005). 
 Jansen, Marius B. and John Whitney Hall, eds. (1989). The Emergence of Meiji Japan, The Cambridge History of Japan, Vol. 5.  Cambridge: Cambridge University Press. ; ; 
 Keene, Donald. (1984). Dawn to the West: Japanese Literature of the Modern Era.  New York: Holt, Rinehart, and Winston. ; ; 
 Ravina, Mark. (2004). The Last Samurai: The Life and Battles of Saigo Takamori. Hoboken, New Jersey: Wiley. ; 

|-

Imperial Japanese Navy admirals
Japanese military leaders
Government ministers of Japan
Kazoku
People of Meiji-period Japan
People from Tokyo
Samurai
Hatamoto
People of the Boshin War
People of Bakumatsu
Empire of Japan
1836 births
1908 deaths
19th-century national presidents
Heads of state in Asia
Heads of state of former countries
Foreign ministers of Japan
Education ministers of Japan